Puga is a surname. Notable people with this surname include:

 Alan Puga (born 1995), Mexican footballer
 Amalia Puga de Losada (1866–1963), Peruvian writer
 Antonio de Puga (1602–1648), Spanish painter
 Arturo Puga (1879–1970), Chilean military officer
 Benoît Puga (born 1953), French general
 Bertha Puga Martínez (1909–2007), Colombian first lady
 Héctor Pablo Ramírez Puga (born 1967), Mexican politician
 Manuel Maria Puga y Parga (1874–1918), Spanish chef
 María Luisa Puga (1944–2004), Mexican writer
 Rogerio Miguel Puga (born 1974), Portuguese academic

See also
 PuGa, Plutonium–gallium alloy